Guido Andreozzi and Facundo Argüello are the defending champions, but chose not to participate. Gero Kretschmer and Alexander Satschko won the title, defeating Kenny de Schepper and Maxime Teixeira 7–6(7–3), 6–4.

Seeds

Draw

References
 Main Draw

Citta di Como Challenger - Doubles
Città di Como Challenger